Gold Award for Best Debut Actor in a Lead Role - Male is an award given as part of its annual Gold Awards for TV serials, to recognize a debut actor who has delivered an outstanding performance in a leading role.

List of winners

2000s
2007 Sharad Malhotra - Banoo Main Teri Dulhann  as Sagar Singh
Jay Bhanushali - Kayamath as Neev Shergill
Ajay Singh Chaudhary - Love Story as Dev
Romit Raj - Ghar Ki Lakshmi Betiyaan as Yuvraj Garodia
2008 Kinshuk Mahajan - Sapna Babul Ka...Bidaai as Ranveer
Angad Hasija - Sapna Babul Ka...Bidaai as Alekh
 Karan Hukku - Kasamh Se as Daksh
Saurabh Pandey - Jiya Jale as Chandan
Harshad Chopda - Kis Desh Mein Hai Meraa Dil as Prem Juneja
Vikrant Massey - Dharamveer as Dharam
2009 Not Awarded

2010s
2010 Nandish Sandhu - Uttaran as Veer Singh Bundela
Kavi Shastri - Rishta.Com as Rohan Mehra
Shashank Vyas - Balika Vadhu as Jagdish
Rahul Bagga - Powder as Mahindra Ranade
Abhishek Tiwari - Chand Chupa Badal Mein as Siddharth Sood
Mohit Malhotra - Mitwa Phool Kamal Ke as Birju
2011  Arhaan Behl - Mann Kee Awaaz Pratigya as Krishna Sajjan Singh
2012 Kushal Tandon - Ek Hazaaron Mein Meri Behna Hai as Virat Singh Vadhera 
Rithvik Dhanjani - Pavitra Rishta as Arjun Digvijay Kirloskar
Gaurav S Bajaj - Sapnon Se Bhare Naina as Daksh Patwardhan
Ashish Kapoor - Dekha Ek Khwab as Yuvraj Rajkumar Udayveer Singh
Sumit Vats - Hitler Didi as Rishi
Sujay Reu - Ram Milaye Jodi as Anukalp Gandhi
2013 Nakuul Mehta - Pyaar Ka Dard Hai Meetha Meetha Pyaara Pyaara as Aditya Harish Kumar (Adi) 
Kunwar Amar - Dil Dosti Dance as Reyansh Singhania (Rey)
Mudit Nayar - Anamika as Jeet Pratap Saluja (Anamika)
Shaleen Malhotra - Har Yug Mein Ayega Ek -Arjun as Arjun Suryakant Raute
Nishad Vaidya - Amita Ka Amit as Amit Shah
2014 Harshad Arora - Beintehaa as Zain Osman Abdullah
Mishkat Varma - Aur Pyaar Ho Gaya as Raj Purohit
Shivin Narang - Ek Veer Ki Ardaas...Veera as Ranvijay Sampooran Singh
Vishal Vashishta - Ek Veer Ki Ardaas...Veera as Baldev Balwant Singh
Himanshu Soni - Buddha as Buddha
2015 Siddharth Nigam - Chakravartin Ashoka Samrat as Ashoka
2016 Rohan Mehra - Yeh Rishta Kya Kehlata Hai as Naksh Singhania
2017 Mohsin Khan - Yeh Rishta Kya Kehlata Hai as Karthik Goenka
2018 Ritvik Arora - Tu Aashiqui as Ahaan Dhanrajgir
2019 Sumedh Mudgalkar - RadhaKrishn as Krishna

References

Gold Awards
Gold Award